The following is a list of squads for each nation who competed at the 2009 FIFA Confederations Cup in South Africa from 14 June to 28 June 2009, as a prelude to the 2010 FIFA World Cup. Each squad consisted of 23 players, three of which had to be goalkeepers. Replacement of injured players was permitted until 24 hours before the team's game. Players marked (c) were named as captain for their national team.

Caps, goals and ages as of 14 June 2009, before 2009 FIFA Confederations Cup.

Group A

Iraq
Head coach:  Bora Milutinović

New Zealand
Head coach: Ricki Herbert

South Africa
Head coach:  Joel Santana

Spain
Head coach: Vicente del Bosque

Group B

Brazil
Head coach: Dunga

Egypt
Head coach: Hassan Shehata

Italy
Head coach: Marcello Lippi

United States
Head coach: Bob Bradley

Player statistics
Player representation by club

Player representation by club nationality

* Nations in italics are not represented by their national teams in the tournament.

Notes and references

External links
FIFA Confederations Cup South Africa 2009 at fifa.com

FIFA Confederations Cup squads
Squads